This is a list of National Basketball Association players whose last names begin with M.

The list also includes players from the American National Basketball League (NBL), the Basketball Association of America (BAA), and the original American Basketball Association (ABA). All of these leagues contributed to the formation of the present-day NBA.

Individuals who played in the NBL prior to its 1949 merger with the BAA are listed in italics, as they are not traditionally listed in the NBA's official player registers.

M

Sheldon Mac
Mike Macaluso
Ed Macauley
Todd MacCulloch
Ronnie MacGilvray
Scott Machado
Arvydas Macijauskas
Oliver Mack
Sam Mack
Shelvin Mack
Malcolm Mackey
Rudy Macklin
Vernon Macklin
Johnny Macknowski
Don MacLean
Bob MacLeod
Daryl Macon
Mark Macon
J. P. Macura
Kyle Macy
Jack Maddox
Tito Maddox
Gerald Madkins
Mark Madsen
Norm Mager
Josh Magette
Corey Maggette
Dave Magley
Jamaal Magloire
Will Magnay
Randolph Mahaffey
Ian Mahinmi
John Mahnken
Brian Mahoney
Francis Mahoney
Rick Mahorn
Dan Majerle
Renaldo Major
Thon Maker
Paul Maki
Red Malackany
Lionel Malamed
Eddie Malanowicz
Théo Maledon
Johnny Malokas
Jeff Malone
Karl Malone
Moses Malone
Matt Maloney
Steve Malovic
Mike Maloy
Sandro Mamukelashvili
Ted Manakas
John Mandic
Karim Mané
Frank Mangiapane
Terance Mann
Tre Mann
Danny Manning
Ed Manning
Guy Manning
Rich Manning
Nico Mannion
Pace Mannion
Nick Mantis
Pete Maravich
Press Maravich
Devyn Marble
Roy Marble
Stephon Marbury
Šarūnas Marčiulionis
Saul Mariaschin
Jack Marin
Shawn Marion
Boban Marjanović
Lauri Markkanen
Damir Markota
Sean Marks
Harvey Marlatt
Jim Marsh
Ricky Marsh
Donny Marshall
Donyell Marshall
Kendall Marshall
Naji Marshall
Rawle Marshall
Tom Marshall
Vester Marshall
Bill Martin
Bob Martin
Brian Martin
Caleb Martin
Cartier Martin
Cody Martin
Cuonzo Martin
Darrick Martin
Dino Martin
Don Martin
Fernando Martín
Jarell Martin
Jeff Martin
Jeremiah Martin
Kelan Martin
Kenyon Martin
Kenyon Martin Jr.
Kevin Martin
LaRue Martin
Maurice Martin
Phil Martin
Slater Martin
Tyrese Martin
Whitey Martin
Jamal Mashburn
Al Masino
Anthony Mason
Desmond Mason
Frank Mason III
Joel Mason
Roger Mason Jr.
Tony Massenburg
Eddie Mast
Yante Maten
Garrison Mathews
Mangok Mathiang
Dakota Mathias
Johnny Mathis
Bennedict Mathurin
Wes Matthews
Wesley Matthews
Ariel Maughan
Frank Maury
Marlon Maxey
Tyrese Maxey
Jason Maxiell
Cedric Maxwell
Vernon Maxwell
Don May
Scott May
Sean May
Lee Mayberry
Clyde Mayes
Tharon Mayes
Bill Mayfield
Ken Mayfield
Eric Maynor
O. J. Mayo
Skylar Mays
Travis Mays
Matt Mazza
Luc Mbah a Moute
D. J. Mbenga
Johnny McAdams
Bob McAdoo
James Michael McAdoo
Ken McBride
Miles McBride
Bill McCahan
Tahjere McCall
Ray McCallum, Jr.
Bob McCann
Brendan McCann
Mel McCants
Rashad McCants
Mike McCarron
Andre McCarter
Willie McCarter
Johnny McCarthy
Howie McCarty
Kelly McCarty
Walter McCarty
Amal McCaskill
Patrick McCaw
Dwayne McClain
Ted McClain
Dan McClintock
Jack McCloskey
George McCloud
Mac McClung
CJ McCollum
Gordon McComb
John McConathy
Bucky McConnell
T. J. McConnell
Keith McCord
Tim McCormick
Jelani McCoy
Paul McCracken
Chris McCray
Rodney McCray
Scooter McCray
Erik McCree
Chris McCullough
John McCullough 
Clint McDaniel
Xavier McDaniel
Jaden McDaniels
Jalen McDaniels
Jim McDaniels
K. J. McDaniels
Bobby McDermott
Doug McDermott
Sean McDermott
Ben McDonald
Bill McDonald
Glenn McDonald
Michael McDonald
Roderick McDonald
Hank McDowell
Antonio McDyess
Robert McElliott
Jim McElroy
Pat McFarland
Ivan McFarlin
Mel McGaha
Mitch McGary
JaVale McGee
Mike McGee
Bill McGill
George McGinnis
Jon McGlocklin
Vince McGowan
Bryce McGowens
Tracy McGrady
Gil McGregor
Cameron McGriff
Elton McGriff
Rodney McGruder
Al McGuire
Allie McGuire
Dick McGuire
Dominic McGuire
Kevin McHale
Maurice McHartley
Jim McIlvaine
Jeff McInnis
Kennedy McIntosh
Bob McIntyre
Jerry McKee
Kevin McKenna
Forrest McKenzie
Stan McKenzie
Derrick McKey
Aaron McKie
Billy McKinney
Bones McKinney
Carlton McKinney
Trey McKinney-Jones
Alfonzo McKinnie
JaQuori McLaughlin
Jordan McLaughlin
Ben McLemore
McCoy McLemore
George McLeod
Keith McLeod
Roshown McLeod
Curt McMahon
Jack McMahon
Mike McMichael
Nate McMillan
Tom McMillen
Jim McMillian
Shellie McMillon
Mal McMullen
Chet McNabb
Mark McNamara
Joe McNamee
Jerel McNeal
Chris McNealy
Bob McNeill
Larry McNeill
Carl McNulty
Paul McPherson
Roy McPipe
Cozell McQueen
Jordan McRae
Thales McReynolds
Josh McRoberts
Eric McWilliams
Dean Mealy
George Mearns
Gene Mechling
Slava Medvedenko
Darnell Mee
Chick Meehan
Jodie Meeks
Cliff Meely
Scott Meents
Bernie Mehen
Dick Mehen
Don Meineke
Carl Meinhold
Salah Mejri
Gal Mekel
Frank Mekules
Bill Melchionni
Gary Melchionni
Nicolò Melli
Fab Melo
De'Anthony Melton
Ed Melvin
Dean Meminger
Chuck Mencel
Murray Mendenhall Jr.
John Mengelt
Mengke Bateer
Ken Menke
Pops Mensah-Bonsu
DeWitt Menyard
Ron Mercer
Joe C. Meriweather
Porter Meriwether
Sam Merrill
Tom Meschery
Chimezie Metu
Big Moose Meyer
Bill Meyer
Little Moose Meyer
Loren Meyer
Tom Meyer
Dave Meyers
Ward Meyers
Stan Miasek
Larry Micheaux
Jordan Mickey
Khris Middleton
Ted Migdal
Red Mihalik
Chris Mihm
Eric Mika
Ed Mikan
George Mikan
Larry Mikan
Vern Mikkelsen
Al Miksis
Aaron Miles
C. J. Miles
Darius Miles
Eddie Miles
Marko Milič
Darko Miličić
Nat Militzok
Andre Miller
Anthony Miller
Bill Miller
Bob Miller
Brad Miller
Darius Miller
Dick Miller
Eddie Miller
Harry Miller
Jay Miller
Larry Miller
Malcolm Miller
Mike Miller
Oliver Miller
Quincy Miller
Reggie Miller
Walt Miller
Chris Mills
Ed Mills
Jack Mills
John Mills
Patty Mills
Terry Mills
Elijah Millsap
Paul Millsap
Shake Milton
Harold Miner
Dirk Minniefield
Dave Minor
Greg Minor
Mark Minor
Josh Minott
Nikola Mirotić
Wataru Misaka
Jason Miskiri
Davion Mitchell
Donovan Mitchell
Guy Mitchell
Leland Mitchell
Mike Mitchell
Murray Mitchell
Sam Mitchell
Todd Mitchell
Tony Mitchell (b. 1989)
Tony Mitchell (b. 1992)
Naz Mitrou-Long
Steve Mix
Bill Mlkvy
Cuttino Mobley
Eric Mobley
Evan Mobley
Isaiah Mobley
Doug Moe
Ed Moeller
Larry Moffett
Leo Mogus
Nazr Mohammed
John Moir
John Moiseichik
Jérôme Moïso
Paul Mokeski
Adam Mokoka
Jack Molinas
Wayne Molis
Sidney Moncrief
Chima Moneke
Eric Money
Sergei Monia
Malik Monk
Earl Monroe
Greg Monroe
Rodney Monroe
Luis Montero
Howie Montgomery
Jim Montgomery
Eric Montross
Bud Moodler
Moses Moody
Jamario Moon
Xavier Moon
Jim Mooney
Matt Mooney
Andre Moore
Ben Moore
Dudey Moore
E'Twaun Moore
Gene Moore
Jackie Moore
Johnny Moore
Larry Moore
Lowes Moore
Mikki Moore
Otto Moore
Richie Moore
Ron Moore
Tracy Moore
Wendell Moore Jr.
Ja Morant
Eric Moreland
Jackie Moreland
Dale Morey
Guy Morgan
Juwan Morgan
Rex Morgan
Elmore Morgenthaler
Darren Morningstar
Chris Morris
Darius Morris
Isaiah Morris
Jaylen Morris
Marcus Morris
Markieff Morris
Max Morris
Monté Morris
Randolph Morris
Terence Morris
Adam Morrison
Emmett Morrison
John Morrison
Mike Morrison
Red Morrison
Anthony Morrow
George Morse
Ray Morstadt
Dwayne Morton
John Morton
Richard Morton
Al Moschetti
Glenn Mosley
Perry Moss
Lawrence Moten
Donatas Motiejūnas
Johnathan Motley
Hanno Möttölä
Arnett Moultrie
Pete Mount
Rick Mount
Alonzo Mourning
Timofey Mozgov
Chuck Mrazovich
Emmanuel Mudiay
Erwin Mueller
Tex Mueller
Shabazz Muhammad
Mychal Mulder
Joe Mullaney
Ed Mullen
Bob Mullens
Byron Mullens
Chris Mullin
Jeff Mullins
Bob Mulvihill
Todd Mundt
Xavier Munford
Chris Munk
George Munroe
Eric Murdock
Gheorghe Mureșan
Ade Murkey
Allen Murphy
Calvin Murphy
Dick Murphy
Erik Murphy
Jay Murphy
Kevin Murphy
Ronnie Murphy
Tod Murphy
Trey Murphy III
Troy Murphy
Dejounte Murray
Keegan Murray
Ken Murray
Lamond Murray
Ronald Murray
Tracy Murray
Willie Murrell
Dorie Murrey
Toure' Murry
Džanan Musa
Mike Muscala
Angelo Musi
Jerrod Mustaf
Dikembe Mutombo
Martin Müürsepp
Pete Myers
Sviatoslav Mykhailiuk

References
  NBA & ABA Players with Last Names Starting with M @ basketball-reference.com
 NBL Players with Last Names Starting with M @ basketball-reference.com

M